Stanfill is a surname. Notable people with the surname include:

Bill Stanfill (born 1947), American football player
Dennis Carothers Stanfill, American businessman and philanthropist
Kristian Stanfill (born 1983), American singer-songwriter
Louis Stanfill (born 1985), American rugby union player
William A. Stanfill (1892–1971), American politician

See also
Stanfill, Kentucky, unincorporated community in Harlan County, Kentucky, United States